Hammarvika is a village in the municipality of Frøya in Trøndelag county, Norway.

The Frøya Tunnel to the neighboring island of Hitra begins at Hammarvika and goes underneath the Frøyfjorden to the south.

References

Frøya, Trøndelag
Villages in Trøndelag